El Silencio may refer to:

El Silencio (es), district in Caracas, Venezuela
El Silencio, station of Caracas metro
 El Silencio, Panama, small town in Bocas del Toro 
El Silencio, Costa Rica, village and nature park in the Guanacaste Province, Costa Rica. 
El Silencio (album), 1992 album by Caifanes
El Silencio, 1938 novel by Juan Felipe Toruño